André Gabias (born May 20, 1956) is a politician in Quebec, Canada. He holds a degree in law from the Université de Sherbrooke, and has been a member of the Quebec Bar since 1981.  Since 1984, he has taught law at the Université du Québec à Trois-Rivières and is a member of the National Assembly of Quebec. He represents the electoral district of Trois-Rivières and is a member of the Quebec Liberal Party (QLP).

Born in Trois-Rivières, Quebec, Gabias was first elected in the 2003 election, and originally served as the Parliamentary Assistant to the Minister of Public Security.  In the spring of 2005, he was appointed as the Parliamentary Assistant to the Minister of Economic Development, Innovation and Export Trade.

Gabias is preceded in his political career by his father, past Trois-Rivières MLA and Union Nationale Minister Yves Gabias, and his grandfather Joseph-Maurice Gabias, once Liberal MLA for Montréal—Saint-Henri and Assistant Mayor of the City of Montreal.  Prior to serving as a member of the Quebec legislature, he maintained a private civil and commercial practice in municipal and administrative law.  He is also the founder and President of the Jeune Chambre de Commerce (Junior Chamber of Commerce) of the Mauricie, and is the founder of Opération Nez rouge (Operation Red Nose) for Trois-Rivières.

In the 2007 Quebec elections, Gabias lost the seat to the Action démocratique du Québec's Sébastien Proulx who had received the support of Trois-Rivières mayor Yves Lévesque during the campaign.

References 
 

1956 births
Living people
People from Trois-Rivières
Quebec Liberal Party MNAs
Université de Sherbrooke alumni
21st-century Canadian politicians